André Pierre Louis Dupuy (born 13 February 1940) is a French prelate of the Catholic Church who worked in the diplomatic service of the Holy See from 1974 to 2015.

Biography
André Pierre Louis Dupuy was born on 13 February 1940 in Soustons, Aquitaine. He was ordained a priest of the Diocese of Aire and Dax on 8 July 1972. He studied in Bordeaux, Dax and Rome, earning a doctorate in history. He entered the diplomatic service of the Holy See and between 1974 and 1991 fulfilled assignments in Venezuela, Tanzania, the Netherlands, Lebanon, Iran and Ireland. He worked at Permanent Mission of the Holy See to the United Nations in New York from 1991 to 1993.

On 6 April 1993, Pope John Paul II appointed him Titular Archbishop of Selsea and  Apostolic Nuncio to Ghana, Benin, and Togo. He received his episcopal consecration in Dax on 6 June from Cardinal Angelo Sodano, Secretary of State.

He resigned as Apostolic Nuncio to Benin on 27 November 1999.

On 27 March 2000, John Paul named him Nuncio to Venezuela. While in that post, he edited a collection of excerpts from more than 1300 speeches delivered by representatives of the Holy See to international organizations between 1970 and 2000. It appeared in 2003 as Words That Matter. He described it as "a work instrument meant for experts in international law, a text for diplomats to consult and for whoever wishes to better know the Holy See's position on certain international questions".

Pope Benedict XVI named him Nuncio to the European Community on 24 February 2005, adding the role of Nuncio to Monaco on 11 July 2006. He was the first to hold the title of Nuncio to Monaco.

On 15 December 2011, Benedict appointed him Nuncio to the Netherlands.

His career as an apostolic nuncio ended with the appointment of his successor as nuncio to the Netherlands, Aldo Cavalli, on 21 March 2015.

Writings

See also
 List of heads of the diplomatic missions of the Holy See

Notes

References

Apostolic Nuncios to Ghana
Apostolic Nuncios to Venezuela
Apostolic Nuncios to the Netherlands
1940 births
Living people
Apostolic Nuncios to Monaco
Apostolic Nuncios to Togo
Apostolic Nuncios to Benin
Apostolic Nuncios to the European Union
People from Landes (department)
French expatriates in Italy
French expatriates in Venezuela
French expatriates in Ghana
French expatriates in Tanzania
French expatriates in the Netherlands
French expatriates in Lebanon
French expatriates in Iran
French expatriates in Ireland
French expatriates in the United States
French expatriates in Benin
French expatriates in Togo